20 Granite Creek is the rock band Moby Grape's fifth album. After recording their last album for Columbia Records, Truly Fine Citizen, the band went on hiatus until 1971 when they reunited with Skip Spence and Bob Mosley and recorded this reunion album for Reprise Records; their only album for the label. David Rubinson, who produced most of the band's Columbia albums, was back as producer here, as well as serving as the band's manager.. The album title refers to an address near Santa Cruz, CA but there is no record that any band member ever lived there. The rights to this album are now owned by the band after previous manager, Matthew Katz, lost them when the band successfully sued him in 2007.

Critical reception 

Reviewing for Rolling Stone in 1971, music critic Richard Meltzer found the album remarkable and said that it "proves that without an audience and with all the members of the original Grape aboard ship they can outdo Truly Fine Citizen with their eyes closed." By contrast, Robert Christgau of The Village Voice found it drab and marred by kotos, but warmed to the album over time; in Christgau's Record Guide: Rock Albums of the Seventies (1981), he said Moby Grape sounds intense and hopeful for a band in decline: "You can hear the country undertone now, but you can also hear why you missed it—at their most lyrical these guys never lay back, and lyricism is something they're usually rocking too hard to bother with, though their compact forms guarantee poetic justice."

Track listing
Side one

Side two

Personnel
 Peter Lewis - rhythm guitar, vocals
 Jerry Miller - lead guitar, vocals
 Bob Mosley - bass; drums (track #9); vocals
 Skip Spence - rhythm guitar; koto; vocals
 Don Stevenson - drums; electric guitar (#3); vocals
 Gordon Stevens - electric viola, dobro, mandolin

Additional personnel
 Jeffrey Cohen - bass (#9)
 Andy Narell - steel drums
 David Rubinson - electric piano, congas

Charts
Album – Billboard

References

External links 
 

Moby Grape albums
1971 albums
Reprise Records albums
Albums produced by Dave Rubinson